iTunes Originals – Goo Goo Dolls is an iTunes Originals album by the Goo Goo Dolls, released digitally by iTunes on August 1, 2006 (see 2006 in music). It includes interviews and new versions of pre-existing songs not released on any other CD.

Track listing

Notes
As of March 7, 2016 the album is no longer for sale in the American iTunes store.

References

Goo Goo Dolls compilation albums
2006 compilation albums
Warner Records compilation albums
Goo Goo Dolls